Adrian is a city in the U.S. state of Michigan and the county seat of Lenawee County.  The population was 20,645 at the 2020 census. Adrian lies in Michigan's 5th congressional district.

History

Adrian was founded on June 18, 1826 by Addison Comstock.  The original name for the village was Logan, but was changed soon after to Adrian, perhaps in reference to the Roman emperor Hadrian. The first operating railroad in Michigan was a horse-drawn train running between Adrian and Toledo in 1836.  Adrian grew quickly, with the sixth largest population in the state when Michigan was admitted to the Union in 1837, and the third largest population in the state by 1860. Adrian was incorporated as a village on March 28, 1836, then as a city on January 31, 1853.

Underground Railroad

Evangelical and Hicksite Quakers in Southeast Michigan founded the first congregation of Quakers in Michigan in 1831. They also created a network of Underground Railroad stations in the Raisin River Valley. Daniel Smith was the first leader of the Raisin Valley Friends Meeting House. His daughter, Laura Smith Haviland became one of the most prominent equal rights activists and Underground Railroad operators in the nation. Elizabeth Margaret Chandler established the Logan Female Anti-Slavery Society in October 1832. Chandler’s society preceded the Female Anti-Slavery Society in Philadelphia and the Michigan statewide organization. The Adrian-Tecumseh Underground Railroad network was established by a Baptist minister in northern Lenawee County.

Late 1800s and 1900s 
The only remaining piece of the Bank of Pennsylvania— one of the stone pillars — was moved to Adrian, Michigan and erected as the Civil War Memorial in commemoration of those in Adrian who died in the American Civil War.

In the late 19th century through early 20th century Adrian was known as the "fence capital of the world," when J. Wallace Page invented the first successful wire fence. Adrian became known worldwide as a fencing manufacturing hub and its fences were shipped as far as New York, Berlin, Asia, and Africa. The company sponsored the highly successful Page Fence Giants black baseball team.

Adrian was an early auto manufacturing hub.  One of the first motor vehicles, the Lion automobile, was created in Adrian. Between 1900 and 1912, three major car models were manufactured in Adrian; in addition to the Lion the Murry Motor Car and Lenawee Car were made by the Church Manufacturing Company in Adrian. The area was poised to be a world center until bad financial decisions at Church Manufacturing Company and a 1912 plant fire at Lion Automobile led to the demise of both companies.

Throughout the 1900s Adrian continued to grow, doubling in size, but as a slower rate than Michigan as a whole (which tripled in size).

Culture and life
A portion of the city is on the border between Adrian Township and Madison Charter Township, although the city is politically independent of both. The city's urban area extends beyond the city limits into both of those townships as well as into nearby Raisin Township and Palmyra Township.

Adrian is sometimes referred to as "the Maple City" due in part to the many sugar maple and other maple tree species found throughout the city. The Adrian High School sports teams are known as the "Adrian Maples" and several local businesses use maple in their names.

Adrian's cultural life has connections to the mid-19th century. The Adrian City Band is one of the oldest continuously active community bands in the country, founded in 1838. The Croswell Opera House is the oldest theatre in Michigan. The Adrian Symphony Orchestra was founded in 1981. Adrian College and Siena Heights University also offer many cultural opportunities.

Heritage Park and Trestle Park have extensive mountain bike trails and boardwalks along the river. Trestle Park features a pedestrian walkway along a former railroad trestle.

Geography

Many town residents take advantage of this area for boating and recreation. Devils Lake, Round Lake, Posey Lake and Wamplers Lake are popular weekend destinations within a few miles.

Climate

Demographics

2010 census
As of the census of 2010, there were 21,133 people, 7,831 households, and 4,531 families living in the city. The racial makeup of the city was 84.1% White, 4.4% African American, 0.6% Native American, 0.9% Asian, 5.9% from other races, and 4.0% from two or more races. Hispanic or Latino residents of any race were 18.8% of the population.

There were 7,831 households, of which 31.7% had children under the age of 18 living with them, 35.8% were married couples living together, 16.7% had a female householder with no husband present, 5.3% had a male householder with no wife present, and 42.1% were non-families. 34.7% of all households were made up of individuals, and 12.3% had someone living alone who was 65 years of age or older. The average household size was 2.37 and the average family size was 3.06.

The median age in the city was 32.5 years. 23% of residents were under the age of 18; 17.2% were between the ages of 18 and 24; 23.5% were from 25 to 44; 22.1% were from 45 to 64; and 14.2% were 65 years of age or older. The gender makeup of the city was 47.8% male and 52.2% female.

2000 census
As of the census of 2000, there were 21,574 people, 7,908 households, and 4,855 families living in the city. The racial makeup of the city was 84.47% White, 3.52% Black, 0.62% Native American, 0.83% Asian, 0.2%, 0.02% Pacific Islander, 7.72% from other races, and 2.83% from two or more races. Hispanic or Latino of any race were 16.99% of the population.

There were 7,908 households, out of which 31.7% had children under the age of 18 living with them, 40.8% were married couples living together, 15.9% had a female householder with no husband present, and 38.6% were non-families. 31.5% of all households were made up of individuals, and 12.9% had someone living alone who was 65 years of age or older. The average household size was 2.45 and the average family size was 3.09.

In the city, the population was spread out, with 25.3% under the age of 18, 15.4% from 18 to 24, 25.5% from 25 to 44, 19.0% from 45 to 64, and 14.8% who were 65 years of age or older. The median age was 32 years. For every 100 females, there were 87.0 males. For every 100 females age 18 and over, there were 80.8 males.

The median income for a household in the city was $32,405, and the median income for a family was $42,069. Males had a median income of $31,500 versus $23,359 for females. The per capita income for the city was $16,528. About 9.8% of families and 13.8% of the population were below the poverty line, including 15.5% of those under age 18 and 19.8% of those age 65 or over.

Government and politics 

Adrian is run by a city commission headed by a mayor. In November 2019, Angela Sword Heath defeated Shane Mackey to become the city's first female mayor. Its sister city is Moriyama, Shiga Prefecture, Japan. While Lenawee County is a close county that leans Republican, elections in Adrian are close but lean Democratic. The three voting precincts on Adrian's east side are more Democratic than the three on Adrian's west side.

Economy

Top employers
According to Adrian's 2021 Comprehensive Annual Financial Report, the top employers in the city are:

Education 

Adrian Public Schools serves Adrian and the surrounding area.

St. Stephen Lutheran School is a Christian PreK-8 school of the Wisconsin Evangelical Lutheran Synod in Adrian.

There are three colleges and universities in the city, namely:
 Adrian College
 Siena Heights University
 Jackson College

Media
The Daily Telegram is Adrian's local daily newspaper which covers the entire county.

Local radio stations include WABJ 1490 AM (mainly syndicated talk); WLEN – 103.9 and 96.5 FM (news); WQTE 95.3 FM (country music); and WVAC 107.9 FM (student-operated radio from Adrian College). WBCL in Fort Wayne also operates a translator FM station in Adrian at 97.7.

Adrian is also served by radio and television signals from Ann Arbor, Toledo, and Jackson, and some Detroit broadcasters can also be seen or heard in parts of the area.

Notable people

Major highways

References

External links

City of Adrian

 
Populated places established in 1826
Cities in Lenawee County, Michigan
County seats in Michigan
Micropolitan areas of Michigan
1826 establishments in Michigan Territory